Pittsburgh Landscape is a 1954 painted steel abstract sculpture, by David Smith.

It is in the Hirshhorn Museum and Sculpture Garden.

See also
 List of public art in Washington, D.C., Ward 2

References

1954 sculptures
Abstract sculptures in Washington, D.C.
Hirshhorn Museum and Sculpture Garden
Modernist sculpture
Outdoor sculptures in Washington, D.C.
Sculptures of the Smithsonian Institution
Steel sculptures in Washington, D.C.